225 Baronne Street, located at 225 Baronne Street in the Central Business District of New Orleans, Louisiana, is a 30-story, 362 feet (110 m)-tall skyscraper.

Between 2013 and 2015 the building underwent a $100 million renovation to convert the former office building into a 188-room Aloft Hotel and 192 residential apartments.  The bottom 10 floors were also converted into a 356 space parking garage.

History
The building originally served as the local headquarters for Boeing when it opened its doors in 1962. It was the tallest building in New Orleans from 1965 to 1967.

See also
 List of tallest buildings in New Orleans

References

External links

 225 Baronne Street at Regis Property Management
 225 Baronne Street at Emporis.com

Skyscraper hotels in New Orleans
Residential skyscrapers in New Orleans
Office buildings completed in 1965
1962 establishments in Louisiana
Hotels established in 2015